The 1925 championship of Primera División Uruguaya was suspended, and in 1926 was another tournament to involve teams of FUF to the AUF. The AUF championship not to be again in dispute until 1927 Uruguayan Primera División.

Overview
Due to internal differences in Uruguayan football, a Uruguayan Federation was created (led by Peñarol) in 1923. The Federation organised two parallel tournaments, one in 1923 won by Montevideo Wanderers, the other in 1924 won by Peñarol. These tournaments are not recognised by the Uruguayan Football Association as Uruguayan championships. The 1925 season was not finished due to these reasons; the Uruguayan government ended the internal difference.

References
Uruguay - List of final tables (RSSSF)

Uruguayan Primera División seasons
Uru
1925 in Uruguayan football